This page shows the results of the archery competition at the 1991 Pan American Games, held from August 2 to August 18, 1991, in Havana, Cuba.

Men's competition

Recurve

Recurve 30 m

Recurve 50 m

Recurve 70 m

Recurve 90 m

Recurve Teams

Women's competition

Recurve

Recurve 30 m

Recurve 50 m

Recurve 60 m

Recurve 70 m

Recurve Teams

Medal table

See also
Archery at the 1992 Summer Olympics

References
 Sports 123

Events at the 1991 Pan American Games
P
1991